Israr Ahmad (26 April 1932 – 14 April 2010) was a Pakistani Islamic theologian, philosopher, and Islamic scholar who was followed particularly in South Asia as well as by South Asian Muslims in the Middle East, Western Europe, and North America.

He was the founder of Tanzeem-e-Islami, an offshoot of the Jamaat-e-Islami. He wrote about sixty books about Islam and Pakistan. As of 2017, twenty nine books have been translated into several other languages, including in English.

Early life and education
Israr Ahmad was born on 26 April 1932 in  Agarwal family in Hisar, Punjab. His father was a civil servant in the British government who relocated his family from Hisar to Montgomery, now Sahiwal, Punjab Province of Pakistan.

After graduating from a local high school, Ahmad moved to Lahore to attend the King Edward Medical University in 1950. He received his MBBS degree from King Edward Medical University in 1954 and began practising medicine. In addition, he obtained his master's degree in Islamic Studies from the University of Karachi in 1965.

Ahmad worked briefly for Muslim Student's Federation in the Independence Movement and, following the creation of Pakistan in 1947, for the Islami Jami`yat-e-Talaba and then in 1950 joined Jamaat-e-Islami led by Abul Ala Maududi, but left the party when the latter opted for participating in electoral politics in 1957. Ahmad resigned from the Jamaat-e-Islami in April 1957 because of its involvement in national politics, which he believed was irreconcilable with the revolutionary methodology adopted by the Jama'at in the pre-1947 period. His interest in Islam and philosophy grew further and he subsequently moved to Karachi, Sindh Province in the 1960s. where he enrolled in Karachi University.

Work

Literature and philosophy

He criticised modern democracy and the prevalent electoral system and argued that the head of an Islamic state could reject the majority decisions of an elected assembly. Ahmad was awarded the Sitara-i-Imtiaz in 1981. He has authored over 60 books in Urdu on topics related to Islam and Pakistan, nine of which have been translated into English and other languages.

Like Mawlana Abu Kalam Azad, Israr held the view of Dhu al-Qarnayn being the Persian king Cyrus.

He held the opinion that apparent contradistinction between the Imam Abu Hanifa and Imam Bukhari is because the former was a jurist and latter was a muhaddith. Israr Ahmed referred a narration about Dajjal in which he said that Saf ibn Sayyad had the biological ability to watch and see from his back.

Health 
Ahmad relinquished the leadership of Tanzeem-e-Islami in October 2002 because of bad health. He had appointed Hafiz Akif Saeed (his son) the Emir of the Tanzeem (from 2002 to 2020) to whom all rufaqaa of Tanzeem renewed their pledge of Baiyah.

Influences
Like Wahiduddin Khan, Naeem Siddiqui and Javed Ahmad Ghamidi, Ahmad also worked closely with Syed Abul A'la Maududi (alternative spelling Syed Maudoodi; often referred to as Maulana Maududi) (1903–1979) and Amin Ahsan Islahi. Supporters describe his vision of Islam as having been synthesised from the diverse sources. He has also acknowledged the "deep influence" of Shah Waliullah Dehlawi, the 18th century Indian Islamic leader, anti-colonial activist, jurist, and scholar.

"In the context of Qur'anic exegesis and understanding, Ahmad was a firm traditionalist of the genre of Mahmud Hasan Deobandi and Shabbir Ahmad Usmani; yet he presented Qur'anic teachings in a scientific and enlightened way".
Ahmad believed in what he called "Islamic revolutionary thought," which consists of the idea that Islam – the teachings of the Qur'an and the Sunnah – must be implemented in the social, cultural, juristic, political, and economic spheres of life. In this he is said to follow Mohammad Rafiuddin and Muhammad Iqbal. The first attempt towards the actualisation of this concept was reportedly made by Abul Kalam Azad through his short-lived party, the Hizbullah. Another attempt was made by Abul Ala Maududi through his Jamaat-e-Islami party. Although the Jamaat-e-Islami has reached some influence, Ahmad resigned from the party in 1956 when it entered the electoral process and believed that such an involvement led to "degeneration from a pure Islamic revolutionary party to a mere political one".

Tanzeem-e-Islami
Originally a member of Jamaat-e-Islami, Ahmad became disappointed with its electoral activity, "significant policy matters", and what he saw as the "lack of effort to create an Islamic renaissance through the revolutionary process."  He and some other individuals resigned from JI and in 1956 founded the nucleus of Tanzeem-e-Islami, an attempt to create a "disciplined organization." "A resolution was passed which subsequently became the Mission Statement of Tanzeem-e-Islami."

Along with his work to revive "the Qur'an-centered Islamic perennial philosophy and world-view" Israr Ahmad aimed with his party to "reform the society in a practical way with the ultimate objective of establishing a true Islamic State, or the System of Khilafah".

A major Pakistani English-language newspaper commented about his views of modern democracy and the electoral system, "A critic of modern democracy and the electoral system, Israr believed that the head of an Islamic state can reject majority decisions of an elected assembly."

Hizb ut-Tahrir
According to Tanzeem-e-Islami's FAQ, while both Hizb ut-Tahrir and Tanzeem-e-Islami share belief in reviving the Caliphate as a means of implementing Islam in all spheres of life, Tanzeem-e-Islami does not believe in involvement in electoral politics, armed struggle, coup d'état to establish a caliphate. However, the Tanzeem-e-Islami believes that once the Islamic revolution has taken place, the election of the Khalifah would be done on the basis of electoral votes. Tanzeem-e-Islami emphasises that iman (faith) among Muslims must be revived in "a significant portion of the Muslim society" before there can be an Islamic revival.

Abul Ala Maududi
While Ahmad "considers himself a product" of the teachings of "comprehensive and holistic concept of the Islamic obligations" of Abul Ala Maududi, he opposed Jamaat-e-Islami's "plunge" into "the arena of power politics," which he considered to have been "disastrous."

Danger of foreign powers

In response to the state of emergency in 2007, Ahmad called for lifting the emergency, reinstatement of Supreme Court justices, and withdrawal of all actions taken in pursuance of the proclamation of emergency and the PCO law besides resignation of President Pervez Musharraf.

In a televised press conference, Ahmad called for resignation of Pervez Musharraf from both president and chief of army staff. Ahmad appealed to President General Musharraf to lift the state emergency and step down for the nation's greater interests. At the television news channels, Ahmad also predicted and warned the nation that, "If the situation worsens, the NATO forces are waiting on the western front to move into Pakistan and may deprive the country of its nuclear assets while on the eastern front, India is ready to stage an action replay of Indo-Pakistani war of 1971 and has alerted its armed forces to intervene in to check threats to peace in the region."

Other views
Asia Times reports that in September 1995 Ahmad told the annual convention of the Islamic Society of North America: "The process of the revival of Islam in different parts of the world is real. A final showdown between the Muslim world and the non-Muslim world, which has been captured by the Jews, would soon take place. The Gulf War was just a rehearsal for the coming conflict." He appealed to the Muslims of the world, including those in the US, to prepare themselves for the coming conflict.

After the Demolition of the Babri Masjid in India, Israr in one of his addresses criticised the vengeful demolition of Hindu temples in Pakistan, calling them unislamic and making the perpetrators the same as Hindu extremists in India.

Death and legacy
Ahmad died of cardiac arrest at his home in Lahore on the morning of 14 April 2010 at the age of 78. He had given up the leadership of Tanzeem-i-Islami in 2002 due to poor health. According to his son, his health deteriorated at around 1:30 am with pain in the back. He was a long time heart patient. His survivors included a wife, four sons and five daughters.

One major Pakistani English-language newspaper commented after his death, "Founder of several organisations like Anjuman-i-Khuddamul Quran, Tanzeem-i-Islami and Tehrik-i-Khilafat, he had followers in Pakistan, India and Gulf countries, especially in Saudi Arabia. He spent almost four decades in trying to reawaken interest in Quran-based Islamic philosophy."

Awards and recognition
Sitara-i-Imtiaz (Star of Excellence) award by the president of Pakistan in 1981 for his contribution in the field of religion.

Books

See also
 Muhammad Tahir-ul-Qadri
 Mufti Tariq Masood
 Dr.Zakir Naik
 Nouman Ali Khan
 Naeem Siddiqui
 Akif Saeed

References

External links

 
 Official website of Quran Academy
  

1932 births
2010 deaths
People from Hisar (city)
Punjabi people
20th-century Pakistani philosophers
Pakistani philosophers
Islamic philosophers
Pakistani activists
Philosophers of religion
University of Karachi alumni
Academic staff of the University of Karachi
Academic staff of the University of the Punjab
20th-century Muslim scholars of Islam
Pakistani Sunni Muslim scholars of Islam
Recipients of Sitara-i-Imtiaz
Pakistani scholars
Pakistani Islamic religious leaders
Pakistani theologians
Quranic exegesis scholars
King Edward Medical University alumni
Pakistani people of Haryanvi descent
Muhajir people
Islamic television preachers
Ameers of Tanzeem-e-Islami